Leonardo da Vinci (S 520) was a  of the Italian Navy.

Construction and career
Leonardo da Vinci was laid down at Fincantieri Monfalcone Shipyard on 1 July 1976 and launched on 20 October 1979. She was commissioned on 6 November 1982.

She has participated in important national and international exercises and in 1989, on the occasion of the international exercise Tapon, she was the first post-war Italian-built submarine to cross the Strait of Gibraltar in submersion, under air and naval conflict under the command of the lieutenant captain Luigi de Benedictis, almost half a century after the glorious ancestor of the Regia Marina, a unit that under the command of the Gianfranco Gazzana-Priaroggia had the primacy of the greatest tonnage of enemy ships sunk during the Second World War.

Entered into reserve fleet (RTD) on 31 December 2007.

She was decommissioned on 30 June 2010. She is currently moored at Quay Sauro Calata San Vito, pier 2, north side in the La Spezia Naval Base.

Gallery

Citations

External links
 

1979 ships
Sauro-class submarines
Ships built by Fincantieri